Emanuel Albert Lewenstein (5 December 1870 – 10 June 1930) was a Dutch-Jewish art collector.

Early life
Emanuel Albert Lewenstein was born in Amsterdam on 5 December 1870, the son of German-Jewish Adolph Lewenstein and Dutch-Jewish Lea Joachimsthal from Amsterdam. His parents founded the Sewingmachinetrade A. Lewenstein (Dutch pronunciation: Naaimachinehandel v/h A. Lewenstein) in Amsterdam in 1868 and designed the famous sewingmachine Lewenstein. Their daughters Rosa and Betty Lewenstein ensured that the company grew into one of the largest supply companies for the clothing industry in the Netherlands. Rosa(Amsterdam, April 4, 1872) did not survive the Second World War. Betty(Amsterdam, Jan 25, 1880) did. Art collector Emanuel Albert Lewenstein was their older brother.

Kandinsky's Das Bunte Leben

Lewenstein bought Wassily Kandinsky's oil painting Das Bunte Leben  (The Colourful Life) immediately after it was created in 1907. After his death, his widow Hedwig loaned it to Amsterdam's Stedelijk Museum for safekeeping.

On 3 March 2017, three of his heirs filed suit in New York City against Bayerische Landesbank who believe they now own it, in respect of the painting, now valued at $80 million. 

The lawsuit claims that the painting was effectively taken and sold without permission, "The painting was taken from its legitimate owners in 1940 in violation of international law during the period of the Nazi occupation in the Netherlands in furtherance of the Nazi campaign of Jewish genocide".

Das Bunte Leben is on show at the Städtische Galerie im Lenbachhaus, in Munich, Germany.

Personal life
On 11 March 1901 in Bonn, Germany, Lewenstein married Hedwig Weyermann (11 Oct 1875 Bonn, Germany - 20 May 1937, Amsterdam), the daughter of Gottschalk Weyermann and Mina Oppenheimer.

They had two children:
Robert Gotschalk Lewenstein (30 Oct 1905, Amsterdam - 1975 Blue Creek, Ohio, US), who married Henriëtte Ruth Opprower
Wilhelmina Helena Lewenstein, who married José Augusto Da Silva

References

1870 births
1930 deaths
Art collectors from Amsterdam